Westwood Collegiate is a high school in Winnipeg, Manitoba. The school teaches grades 9 to 12. Located at 360 Rouge Road, the school is part of the St. James-Assiniboia School Division. In addition to the Provincial Graduation Diploma, Westwood also offers IB Diplomas through the International Baccalaureate Program.

The school's mission statement is "to empower all students and staff for the choices and challenges of the 21st century while working and learning in a safe and supportive environment."

Notable alumni
 Dustin Boyd, professional ice hockey player
 Wendy Crewson, actress (The Santa Clause)
 Tanyalee Davis, stand-up comedian 
 Chris Jericho, professional wrestler (WWE), musician (Fozzy), and TV personality
 Greg MacPherson, singer/songwriter
 Nolan Patrick, professional ice hockey player for the Vegas Golden Knights
 Mark Stone, professional ice hockey player for the Vegas Golden Knights
 Michael Stone (ice hockey), professional ice hockey player for the Calgary Flames
 Joey Vickery, professional basketball player
 Doug Wilson, professional ice hockey defenceman and executive

References

External links
 Westwood Collegiate

High schools in Winnipeg
Educational institutions established in 1960
1960 establishments in Manitoba
International Baccalaureate schools in Manitoba

St. James, Winnipeg